Annopol-Rachów is a village in the administrative district of Gmina Annopol, within Kraśnik County, Lublin Voivodeship, in eastern Poland. It is located very short distance north of Annopol town, on the east bank of Vistula river.

The village has a population of 492. The history of Annopol-Rachów, and Annopol, and are inextricably linked, often combining one with the other as one and the same in written records.

References

External links
 The Jews of Annopol-Rachow at the Yad Vashem website (Hebrew)
 

Villages in Kraśnik County